Tmax may refer to:

 TmaxSoft, a South Korean software company
 Kodak T-MAX, photographic film
 Yamaha TMAX, a maxi scooter

Entertainment
 T-max, a South Korean pop band
 T. Max Graham (1941–2011), professional name of American actor Neil Graham Moran

Pharmacology and physiology
 tmax, the time it takes a drug or other substance to reach the maximum concentration Cmax
 Tmax, abbreviation for transport maximum